Nannizzia is a genus of fungus in the family Arthrodermataceae.

The genus name of Nannizzia is in honour of Arturo Nannizzi (1877-1961), who was an Italian botanist, docent in Mycology and in 1935 was Director of the Botanical Garden in Siena.

The genus was circumscribed by Phyllis Margaret Stockdale in Sabouraudia vol.1 on page 45 in 1961.

Species 
Species accepted within Nannizzia include:

 Nannizzia aenigmatica
 Nannizzia borellii
 Nannizzia cajetana
 Nannizzia cookiella
 Nannizzia corniculata
 Nannizzia duboisii
 Nannizzia fulva
 Nannizzia graeserae
 Nannizzia grubyi
 Nannizzia gypsea
 Nannizzia incurvata
 Nannizzia nana
 Nannizzia obtusa
 Nannizzia ossicola
 Nannizzia otae
 Nannizzia persicolor
 Nannizzia praecox
 Nannizzia quinckeana
 Nannizzia racemosa

References

Further reading

External links

Arthrodermataceae
Eurotiomycetes genera
Taxa described in 1961